Coralliophila aedonia is a species of sea snail, a marine gastropod mollusk in the family Muricidae, the murex snails or rock snails.

The World Register of Marine Species (WoRMS) states that the subgenus Murex (Pseudomurex) has been brought into synonymy with Pseudomurex Monterosato, 1872, leaving the status of  Murex (Pseudomurex) aedonius unchanged. The genus Pseudomurex  in turn has been brought into synonymy with Coralliophila H. Adams & A. Adams, 1853 by M. Oliverio in 2008. This genus contains the species Coralliophila (Pseudomurex) aedonia. Therefore, there is good reason to believe that both species are synonyms.

Description

Distribution
This marine species occurs in the South Atlantic off Nightingale Island; Brazil and off the Azores at depths between 280–1180 m.

References

 Haas F. (1949). On some deepsea mollusks from Bermuda. Buttletí de la Institució Calalana d'Història Natural 37: 69–73
 Garrigues B. & Lamy D. (2017). Muricidae récoltés en Guyane au cours de l’expédition La Planète Revisitée. Xenophora Taxonomy. 15: 29–38.

External links
 Watson R. B. (1886). Report on the Scaphopoda and Gasteropoda collected by HMS Challenger during the years 1873–1876. In: Reports of the scientific results of the voyage of H.M.S. "Challenger", Zoology. 15 (part 42): 1–756, pl. 1–50

Gastropods described in 1885
Coralliophila